Eusebia (Greek: Εύσεβία, died 360) was the second wife of Roman emperor Constantius II. The main sources for the knowledge about her life are Julian's panegyric "Speech of Thanks to the Empress Eusebia", as well as several remarks by the historian Ammianus Marcellinus.

Family
Julian's "Panegyric In Honour Of Eusebia", the primary source for her family and ancestry, states that "she is of a family line that is pure Greek, from the purest of Greeks, and her city is the metropolis of Macedonia". Her father was reportedly the first member of the family to serve as a consul. The Panegyric never gives his name, but modern historians identify him with Flavius Eusebius, consul in 347. This Eusebius is identified elsewhere as a former Magister Equitum and Magister Peditum, which means he had served as a military commander of both the cavalry and infantry of the Roman army. The Prosopography of the Later Roman Empire considers it probable that his consulship came at the end of his military career. He is later styled "Comes".

The Panegyric mentions that Eusebia's father died some time before she married Constantius. Her mother, also unnamed in the speech, did not remarry, but "devoted herself to her children, and won a great reputation for prudence, so great indeed that whereas Penelope, while her husband was still on his travels and wanderings, was beset by those young suitors… no man however fair and tall or powerful and wealthy ever ventured to approach [Eusebia's mother] with any such proposals. And her daughter the Emperor deemed worthy to live by his side".

Ammianus Marcellinus says that Eusebia had two brothers, Eusebius and Hypatius, both of whom served as consuls. According to Ammianus, a corrupt official named Palladius accused these men of treason during the reign of Valens. Although Palladius failed to prove his case, "the accused were punished with exile and with fines; but shortly afterwards they were recalled, had their fines remitted, and were restored to their former rank and honour unimpaired."

The brothers have been identified with Flavius Eusebius and Flavius Hypatius, co-consuls in 359. Eusebius is described as a rhetor in an epistle by Libanius. In the Panegyric, Julian alludes to both brothers having secured high offices through the influence of Eusebia. Libanius identifies Eusebius as governor of the Hellespont c. 355. He was next sent to Antioch and then appointed governor of Bithynia. He held no known offices following his term as consul. Hypatius was possibly vicarius of the city of Rome in 363. Libanius mentions Hypatius appointed Praefectus urbi, c. 378–379. Gregory of Nazianzus mentions Hypatius visiting Constantinople in 381. He served as Praetorian prefect of both the Praetorian prefecture of Italy and the Praetorian prefecture of Illyricum, c. 382–383. An inscription of Gortyn, Crete praises him as the most illustrious of the consuls and praetorian prefects.

Empress 
The Panegyric of Julian places her marriage to Constantius prior to the defeat of rival emperor Magnentius, who was dead by August 353. The marriage of Constantius and Eusebia may have occurred earlier in that year. "When [Constantius] acquired the throne that had belonged to his ancestors, and had won it back from him [Magnentius] who had usurped it by violence and desired to wed that he might beget sons to inherit his honour and power, deemed [Eusebia] worthy of his alliance, when he had already become of almost the whole world". In the original Medieval Greek text the word is "ecumene", a term originally used in the Greco-Roman world to refer to the inhabited Earth. Over time, the word came to mean the civilized world, and to be synonymous with the Roman Empire. The Prosopography interprets the text to mean that Constantius had yet to defeat Magnentius at the time.

Eusebia won much praise for her wisdom and kindness, as well as her loyalty to Constantius, who honoured her by renaming the Dioecesis Pontica as Pietas, the Latin equivalent of the Greek name Eusebia. Both names refer to piety as well as family loyalty, including the loyalty of a wife to her husband. The Epitome de Caesaribus, attributed to Aurelius Victor, describes the imperial couple in less favorable terms: Constantius "was addicted to the love of eunuchs, courtiers, and wives, by whom – satisfied by no deviant or unlawful pleasure – he used to be polluted." Eusebia, his favourite among this alleged multitude of lovers, "was indeed elegant, but, through Adamantiae and Gorgoniae and other dangerous abettors, harmful of her husband's reputation, contrary to what is customary for more upright females whose precepts often aid their husbands."

The Panegyric mentions she asserted her influence early on. "Eusebia… has come to be the partner of her husband's counsels, and though the Emperor is by nature merciful, good and wise, she encourages him to follow yet more becomingly his natural bent, and even turns justice to mercy… no one could even cite a case in which this Empress, whether with justice, as might happen, or unjustly, has ever been the cause of punishment or chastisement either great or small."

Julian goes on to present Eusebia's patronage of her own family, alluding to practice of nepotism by the Empress. "When she had in the beginning secured her husband's good will for her actions… she forthwith showered honours on all her family and kinsfolk, appointing to more important functions those who had already been tested and were of mature age, and making them seem fortunate and enviable, and she won for them the Emperor's friendship and laid the foundations of their present prosperity… And to all who, since they were still obscure on account of their youth, needed recognition of any sort, she awarded lesser honours. And not only on her kinsfolk has she conferred such benefits, but whenever she learned that ties of friendship used to exist with her ancestors, she has not allowed it to be unprofitable to those who owned such ties…"

Again according to the Panegyric, Eusebia made a solo visit to Rome in 354, while Constantius was waging war in Germania. She was welcomed, with much ceremony, by the Roman Senate and general populace, and distributed monetary gifts "to the presidents of the tribes and the centurions of the people."

In 359 the army officer Barbatio was accused of wishing to overthrow Constantius and marry Eusebia. Ammianus says that the principal piece of evidence was a letter from Barbatio's wife Assyria, imploring him not to divorce her; both the couple were executed, although the letter's authenticity has been questioned in modern times.

Patronage of Julian
After Constantius Gallus was executed in 354, "being accused of revolution", his half-brother Julian was likewise suspected, in the words of Sozomen, "of cherishing the love of empire". Ammianus says that opinion in the court of Constantius was largely against Julian, who "would have perished at the instigation of the accursed crew of flatterers, had not, through the favour of divine power, Queen Eusebia befriended him; so he was brought to the town of Comum, near Milan, and after abiding there for a short time, he was allowed to go to Greece for the sake of perfecting his education, as he earnestly desired." Julian thanks Eusebia for her intercession, both in the Panegyric and in his "Letter To The Senate And People of Athens". This latter was written in 361, during a civil war between Julian and Constantius, and is freer in its language than the Panegyric: "had not some one of the gods desired that I should escape, and made the beautiful and virtuous Eusebia kindly disposed to me, I could not then have escaped from [Constantius's] hands myself".

Libanius confirms the story in his "Funeral Oration on Julian", in which he compares Eusebia's timely aid to Julian with "Ino daughter of Cadmus", saving the life of "tempest-tossed" Odysseus. Socrates of Constantinople and Sozomen give collaborating accounts.

The reasons for Eusebia's sponsorship of Julian are unclear. Julian himself attributes it to kindness and to respect for their familial ties: "no other reason can I discover, nor learn from anyone else, why she became so zealous an ally of mine, and an averter of evil and my preserver, and took such troubles and pain in order that I might retain unaltered and unaffected the Emperor's good will." This assessment may include literary and political embellishment, and Ammianus Marcellinus offers more politically sophisticated motives. Modern historians Shaun Tougher and J. Juneau suggest that Eusebia's role may in fact have been part of Constantius's own strategy, using her as a "front woman" in negotiations with Julian, as the two men had a contentious relationship. Eusebia may have been able to help to build a valuable alliance where Constantius needed one.

In 355, needing a deputy to restore order in Gaul, Constantius appointed Julian Caesar. The Panegyric declares that the appointment would never have occurred if not for Eusebia's work behind the scenes, both rehabilitating Julian's reputation in the mind of Constantius and convincing Julian himself to accept the daunting responsibility. Ammianus again describes Eusebia as overcoming the courtiers' hostility towards Julian, but casts doubt upon her motives: she may genuinely have regarded Julian as the right man for the job, but his assignment also meant that Constantius would not personally venture into the dangerous conditions of Gaul and take Eusebia with him. The historian Zosimus, who dubiously praises Eusebia as a "woman of extraordinary learning, and of greater wisdom than her sex is usually endowed with", says that she framed her support of Julian in accord with Constantius' paranoia and perennial distrust of his own family. Emphasizing "that Julian was a young man unacquainted with the intrigues of state... and that he was wholly inexperienced in worldly business", she said that he was likely to be killed in action and thus prevented from causing trouble as Gallus had done. Conversely, any successes he achieved would be credited to the leadership of Constantius.

Before his deployment to Gaul, Julian spent an unhappy interval at Mediolanum, in close proximity to the court of Constantius. His letter to Athens says that he composed a petition to Eusebia asking to be sent home, but a divine premonition warned him that "if I sent it I should meet the most ignominious death. I call all the gods to witness that what I write here is true. For this reason, therefore, I forbore to send the letter."

Residence in Rome and poisoning of Helena
In 357, Constantius celebrated his Vicennalia, the twentieth anniversary of his reign, by moving his court temporarily to Rome. Eusebia accompanied him, in her second recorded visit to the city. "The Cambridge Ancient History" notes that Constantius was following the examples of Diocletian and Constantine I, who also visited Rome during their Vicennalia. The presence of Constantius, Eusebia and Julian's wife Helena marked this as a dynastic display. 

Helena was pregnant, and while in Rome she miscarried. Ammianus accuses Eusebia of conspiring to prevent Helena from having children, since it was undesirable that Julian should have an heir when his superior Constantius II did not. The historian states that, during Helena's previous pregnancy in Gaul, Eusebia had bribed the midwife to kill Julian's son just after birth; in Rome the empress employed other means, inducing Helena "to drink a rare potion, so that as often as she was with child she should have a miscarriage". In the historical study "Ammianus Marcellinus and the Representation of Historical Reality" (1998) by Timothy Barnes, the birth of the stillborn son is estimated to 356, the miscarriage in Rome to 357. Barnes considers the story of the potion-induced miscarriages to be an allegation without further reference. While Edward Gibbon did not dismiss this allegation outright, he preferred to suppose that "public malignity imputed the effects of accident as the guilt of Eusebia". The possibility of such a potion's existence was, in his view, something to be determined by physicians rather than historians. "A History of Medicine" (1995), by Plinio Prioreschi, dismisses the account as an example of a common error in early medical thought, "the attribution to drugs of properties that they could not have". A potion which Helena consumed just once ostensibly retained its effect for years, which Prioreschi calls "an obvious impossibility in the light of modern pharmacology".

"The Propaganda of Power: The Role of Panegyric in Late Antiquity" (1998) contains a number of essays on the subject of panegyrics. Among them is "In praise of an Empress:Julian's speech of thanks to Eusebia" by Shaun Tougher, discussing a "Panegyric In Honour Of Eusebia" written by Julian himself. Tougher examines the relationship of Julian and Eusebia, commenting on whether Helena was affected by it. The historian considers that the image of a politically influential but "kind-hearted and philanthropic" Eusebia is directly based on her depiction in the works of Julian. According to Tougher, later historians have tended to accept this depictions with little to no questioning of it. He regards Eusebia to be the greatest threat to Julian for the duration of his term as Caesar. This rank effectively made Julian heir presumptive to the imperial throne. His position as such relied solely on Constantius and Eusebia remaining childless. Had an heir been born to the imperial couple, Julian could find himself outliving his usefulness to his imperial patrons. Tougher follows the example of senior historian Noël Aujoulat in considering the story of Helena's miscarriages being the result of abortifacients to be entirely plausible. Both historians consider Ammianus' allegations, casting Eusebia as the orchestrator of such a plot, should be taken into consideration and "not be lightly dismissed".

Role in religion
Eusebia used her considerable influence in court to promote the doctrine of Arianism. Her role as an Arian is noted by Sozomen, who described a resurgence of support for this creed after the death of Constantine. Court partisans of Arianism "found an efficient coadjutor in the presbyter who had obtained from Constantine the recall of Arius… he became an intimate of the emperor's wife, and of the powerful eunuchs of the women's sleeping apartments. At this period Eusebius was appointed to superintend the concerns of the royal household, and being zealously attached to Arianism, he induced the empress and many of the persons belonging to the court to adopt the same sentiments."

Theodoret records that Constantius and Eusebia sent money to the exiled Pope Liberius in 355, although Liberius showed his scorn for the imperial court by refusing the gift.

The Suda gives an account of Eusebia's apparent conflict with Leontius, bishop of Tripolis, who held aloof from her at an imperial Synod. She offered to build a church for Leontius if he would meet with her, but received the answer, "[S]o that the respect due to bishops may be preserved, let me come to you, but do you descend at once from your lofty throne and meet me and offer your head to my hands, asking for my blessing.'" The passage goes on to say that Eusebia complained to Constantius, but that the emperor approved of Leontius' stand for the rights of the clergy.

Death
Like Constantius' first wife (whose name is unknown), Eusebia tried unsuccessfully to give birth to a child. It was said that she embraced Arianism when orthodox bishops failed to help her in this endeavour. Philostorgius writes that the Arian bishop and renowned healer Theophilus the Indian was called out of exile to cure Eusebia of hysteria. He is said to have ended the distress she received from her troubled womb, but she still bore no children. Philip R. Amidon, Philostorgius's modern translator and commentator, notes that Eusebia's hysteria is also mentioned by Georgios Kedrenos and Joannes Zonaras. 

Eusebia is reported to have died while in the care of a female practitioner who attempted to restore her fertility. "A History of Women in the West: From Ancient Goddesses to Christian Saints" (1994) relates the circumstances of the empress's death to the "fear of sterility"  in Ancient Roman society. The purpose of marriage in ancient Rome was specifically defined as reproduction, and social expectations required women to be married and with children by their twentieth year. Women whose children were "slow in coming" would seek assistance from religious rituals or from drugs. The fate of Eusebia indicates that the fertility medications available to them were no less dangerous than their abortifacients.

Constantius married his next wife, Faustina, after the death of Eusebia in 360. The period can be estimated by Ammianus who reports that this marriage took place while Constantius was wintering in Antioch, taking a break from the ongoing Roman–Persian Wars. "At that same time Constantius took to wife Faustina, having long since lost Eusebia".

Modern historians
Shaun Tougher notes that the panegyric in honor of Eusebia "tends to be neglected" in favor of two orations Julian wrote about Constantius II. Tougher also notes a tendency to take this text "at face value" instead of receiving "deeper analysis". He offers an analysis on how the oration was influenced by first the praise of Arete as found in the Odyssey by Homer, secondly the treatises on speeches of Menander of Laodicea. Menander advised that the praise on an emperor's virtue should focus on four areas: his courage, justice, temperance and wisdom. Julian manages to praise the justice, temperance and wisdom of Eusebia. Notably missing is any reference to her courage. However, there are additional references to her mildness, clemency, philanthropy and liberality.

Tougher notes that Julian reveals her influence on the decisions of Constantius, but constantly reminds his audience that the authority to decide on any given matter rests with the Emperor, not with the Empress. She persuades but does not command. The historian notes how Julian manages to stray from his titular subject and to offer readers a quite detailed portrait of himself, far more detailed than the one on Eusebia. His self-portrayal covers so much of the oration that in Tougher's words "the rhetorician is in danger of eclipsing his subject.

On the matter of portrayal two key elements are the benevolent portrayal of Eusebia and his "satisfaction" at being sent to Athens. Tougher invites the aspiring historian to be cautious on either one. He notes that the oration manages to incorporate both "implied and direct criticism" of the imperial couple. This is only the version of events presented by Julian. A version that might have managed to influence Ammianus Marcellinus and through him later historians. Julian has shaped the historical narrative and portrayal of much of his life. The luck of other perspectives questions its reliability.

"Ammianus Marcellinus and the Representation of Historical Reality" (1998) by Timothy Barnes focuses on the elements shaping Ammianus' account. He notes that "Just as with the male characters in his history ... Ammianus reveals his personal likes and dislikes without inhibition when dealing with the wives of Emprerors". Barnes notes that his portrayal of Eusebia was mostly positive but his motives may be clearly identified. Eusebia's role as "protector of Julian" and sister of Hypatius would require such positive treatment. The historian clearly portrays Julian as a hero and his allies are cast in a favorable light by association. Ammianus has only warm praise for Hypatius, pointing to the latter being his friend and a probable patron. Even Ammianus' settlement in Rome matches the period when Hypatius was its prefect. Suggesting Ammianus had either arrived in the city with his friend or followed him there at a later date. Thus high praise to the sister of Hypatius.

References

External links
Her own profile in the Prosopography of the Later Roman Empire
Profile of her brother Eusebius in the "Prosopography of the Later Roman Empire"
Profile of her brother Hypatius Prosopography of the Later Roman Empire
Chapter of "Propaganda of Power" analyzing Julian's "Oration in Praise of Eusebia"
Julian's "Epistle to the Athenians"
The account of her death by Philostorgius, translation by Philip R. Amidon
Page of "A History of Women in the West" mentioning her death

4th-century births
360 deaths
Roman-era Thessalonians
4th-century Roman empresses
Constantinian dynasty
Aurelii
Flavii
Arian Christians
Constantius II